The Similan Islands (Malay: Pulau Sembilan) is an archipelago in the Andaman Sea off the coast of, and part of, Phang Nga Province in southern Thailand. It is the maritime border between India and Thailand. It was established as Mu Ko Similan National Park in 1982 after a one-year assessment by the forestry department.

Access and tourism
Access to the Similan Islands is easiest from Tab Lamu Port, just south of Khao Lak in Phang Nga Province. The park headquarters is in Tab Lamu, which is a small fishing village, just 13 km from Bang La On in Khao Lak. Boats depart daily from the middle of October to the middle of May. The trip takes about three hours each way on slower boats or 70 minutes via speedboat.

During the diving season liveaboard boats head to the Similan Islands. These dive boats depart and return from Tab Lamu, Ko Lanta, Phuket, and Ranong and stay for several days at Similan National Marine Park.

The Similan Islands Park is the most overcrowded Thai national park. Five to six thousand persons per day visit the islands during its open season from mid–October to mid–May. The DNP reports that since October 2017 the park has been visited by 883,438 persons. Sheer numbers have resulted in degradation and thus increased regulation.

The park is closed in the rainy season, from 16 May-15 October, every year. The island of Ko Tachai has been closed to tourists indefinitely beginning 15 October 2016 to allow it to recover from effects of its heavy tourist burden. As of the park's re-opening on 15 October 2018, the number of visitors allowed to visit the islands was capped at 3,850 per day in order to slow environmental destruction. Prior to the visitor cap, the islands received about 7,000 visitors per day. In 2017, about 912,000 tourists visited. Tour operators have protested the new rules, saying jobs will be lost. All overnight accommodations on the islands have been demolished as part of the rehabilitation program.

Geography

The islands are at 

For convenience, the Thai Department of National Parks (DNP) has assigned numbers to the islands. From north to south, they are: 
 Island 11: Ko Tachai
 Island 10: Ko Bon, also known as Ko Talu
 Island 9: Ko Ba-ngu, also known as Ko Bayu
 Island 8: Ko Similan
 Island 7: Ko Hin Pousar
 Island 6: Ko Payu, also known as Ko Pa Yu
 Island 5: Ko Ha
 Island 4: Ko Miang, also known as Ko Meang. Park HQ is here.
 Island 3: Ko Payan, also known as Ko Pa Yan
 Island 2: Ko Payang, also known as Ko Pa Yang
 Island 1: Ko Huyong, also known as Ko Hu Yong

The Similans lie 70 kilometres off the coast of Phang Nga Province. "Similan" is a Yawi word meaning 'nine'. Ko Bon and Tachai were added to the national park in 1998.

Ko Similan: Ko Similan is the largest island. The sea in the area has an average depth of 60 feet. Underwater it is full of rock formations and coral reefs in several shapes and forms, resembling such things as deer, leaves, brains, and mushrooms. Above the water are found many diverse species such as the Nicobar pigeon, mangrove monitor lizards, flying fox and more.

Ko Huyong: Ko Huyong has the longest and widest beach in the park. However, the park prohibits any tourists from landing on the island as the beach is a place where turtles come to lay their eggs.

Wildlife protection

Islands 1, 2, and 3 are closed to the public due to a turtle hatching protection program and reef conservation efforts. Island number 3 belongs to a Thai princess. Fishing is banned in Similan and Surin National Parks. However, fishing boats are constantly seen in and around the park. When diving, one can often find nets stuck to reefs and illegal fishing traps. In recent years many illegal fishing traps have been found outside the most common dive sites. They have contained among others trevallies, batfish, barracuda, golden pilot jacks, and triggerfish. Fishing traps seem to be overly abundant around Ko Bon and Ko Tachai.

Important Bird Area
The archipelago has been designated an Important Bird Area (IBA) by BirdLife International because it supports a population of Vulnerable pale-capped pigeons.

See also
List of islands of Thailand
List of national parks of Thailand
List of Protected Areas Regional Offices of Thailand

References

External links

 
 Website, Mu Ko Similan National Park
 Similan Islands Guide
 Similan Islands Dive Center & Snorkeling Center
 Overview of diving the Similan Islands
 Diving maps of Similan islands dive sites

Geography of Phang Nga province
Similan
Andaman Sea
Islands of the Andaman Sea
National parks of Thailand
ASEAN heritage parks
Protected areas established in 1982
Underwater diving sites in Thailand
Tourist attractions in Phang Nga province
1982 establishments in Thailand
Important Bird Areas of Thailand
Important Bird Areas of Indian Ocean islands